The Fasciolariidae, common name the "tulip snails and spindle snails", are a family of small to large sea snails, marine gastropod mollusks in the superfamily Buccinoidea.

The family Fasciolariidae probably appeared about 110 million years ago during the Cretaceous

Distribution

The recent species inhabit tropical to temperate waters.

Description
The shells are usually reddish in color and have a moderate to large size, reaching a height between 1.0 and 60 cm. The shells are spindle-shaped and biconic. The spire is elongated. The siphonal canal is well developed and is long to moderately long. The columella varies between a smooth appearance and showing spiral folds. The horny operculum has an oval shape. Their radula is characteristic with  narrow central teeth with three cusps. The wide lateral teeth show numerous ctenoid (= comblike) cusps.

Snails in the family Fasciolariidae are carnivorous. They feed on other gastropods and on bivalves. Some also prey on worms and barnacles.

The snails are gonochoristic, i.e. the individuals have just one sex. The female snails deposit their eggs in horny capsules either in a single form or in clusters arranged around a hollow axis. The single forms have a flattened, disk-shaped, or vase-shaped form. The clusters are hemispherical or cylindrical. Development is usually direct. The larvae emerge from the capsules as free-swimming young or as crawling young.

Taxonomy
According to the taxonomy of the Gastropoda by Bouchet & Rocroi (2005), the Fasciolariidae consist of the following subfamilies:
 Clavilithinae Vermeij & Snyder, 2018 †
 Fasciolariinae Gray, 1853
 Fusininae Wrigley, 1927 - synonyms: Fusinae Swainson, 1840 (inv.); Cyrtulidae MacDonald, 1869; Streptochetinae Cossmann, 1901
 Peristerniinae Tryon, 1880 - synonym: Latiridae Iredale, 1929

Genera
Genera in the family Fasciolariidae include (fossil genera are marked with  a dagger):
subfamily Clavilithinae Vermeij & Snyder, 2018 †
 † Africolithes Eames, 1957 
 † Austrolithes Finlay, 1931 
 † Chiralithes Olsson, 1930 
 † Clavellofusus Grabau, 1904 
 † Clavilithes Swainson, 1840 
 † Cosmolithes Grabau, 1904 
 † Mancorus Olsson, 1931 
 † Papillina Conrad, 1855 
 † Perulithes Olsson, 1930 
 † Clavella Swainson, 1835  accepted as Clavilithes Swainson, 1840 † (Junior homonym of Clavella Oken, 1815. Has been renamed Clavilithes.)
 † Rhopalithes Grabau, 1904  accepted as Clavilithes Swainson, 1840 † (objective synonym)
 † Turrispira Conrad, 1866  accepted as Clavilithes Swainson, 1840 †
 † Daphnobela Cossmann, 1896 
 † Euthriofusus Cossmann, 1901 
subfamily Fasciolariinae

 Fasciolaria Lamarck, 1799 - type genus, the Tulip shells
 Africolaria Snyder, Vermeij & Lyons, 2012
 Araiofusus Callomon & Snyder, 2017 
 Aurantilaria Snyder, Vermeij & Lyons, 2012
 Australaria Snyder, Vermeij & Lyons, 2012
 Bellifusus Stephenson, 1941 †
 Boltenella Wade, 1917 †
 Brucia Cossmann, 1920 †
 Calkota Squires & Saul, 2003
 Cinctura Hollister, 1957
 Conradconfusus Snyder, 2002 †
 Cryptorhytis Meek, 1876 †
 Drilliovoluta Cossmann, 1925 †
 Drilluta Wade, 1916 †
 Filifusus Snyder, Vermeij & Lyons, 2012
 Glaphyrina Finlay, 1926
 Granolaria Snyder, Vermeij & Lyons, 2012
 Haplovoluta Wade, 1918 †
 Hercorhyncus Conrad, 1869 †
 Hylus Wade, 1917 †
 Kilburnia Snyder, Vermeij & Lyons, 2012
 Liochlamys Dall, 1889 †
 Lirofusus Conrad, 1865 †
 Lugubrilaria Snyder, Vermeij & Lyons, 2012
 Lyonsifusus Vermeij & Snyder, 2018
 Mariafusus Petuch, 1988 †
 Micasarcina Squires & Saul, 2003 †
 Microcolus Cotton & Godfrey, 1932
 Microfulgur Finlay & Marwick, 1937
 Mylecoma Squires & Saul, 2003 †
 Odontofusus Whitfield, 1892 †
 Paleopsephaea Wade, 1926 †
 Parafusus Wade, 1918 †
 Perse B.L. Clark, 1918 †
 Piestochilus Meek, 1864 †
 Plectocion Stewart, 1927 †
 Pleia Finlay, 1930
 Pleuroploca P. Fischer, 1884
 Pliculofusus Snyder, Vermeij & Lyons, 2012 †
 Saginafusus Iredale, 1931
 Scobina Wade, 1917 †
 Serrifusus Meek, 1876 †
 Skyles Saul & Popenoe, 1993 †
 Terebraspira Conrad, 1862 †
 Trichifusus Bandel, 2000 †
 Triplofusus Olsson & Harbison, 1953
 Wadia Cossmann, 1920 †
 Whitneyella Stewart, 1927 †
 Woodsella Wade, 1926 †

subfamily Fusininae
 Fusus Bruguière, 1789 : synonym of Fusinus Rafinesque, 1815

 Aegeofusinus Russo, 2017
 Africofusus Vermeij & Snyder, 2018
 Amiantofusus Fraussen, Kantor & Hadorn, 2007
 † Angustifusus Vermeij & Snyder, 2018 
 Apertifusus Vermeij & Snyder, 2018
 Aptyxis Troschel, 1868
 Araiofusus Callomon & Snyder, 2017 
 Ariefusus Vermeij & Snyder, 2018
 Aristofusus Vermeij & Snyder, 2018
 Barbarofusus Grabau & Shimer, 1909
 Callifusus Vermeij & Snyder, 2018
 Chryseofusus Hadorn & Fraussen, 2003
 Cyrtulus Hinds, 1843 - Cyrtulus serotinus Hinds, 1843
 Enigmofusus Vermeij & Snyder, 2018
 † Eofusus Vermeij & Snyder, 2018 
 Falsicolus Finlay, 1930
 Falsifusus Grabau, 1904 †
 Fredenia Cadée & Janssen, 1994 †
 Fusinus Rafinesque, 1815 - type genus of the subfamily Fusininae
 Gemmocolus Maxwell, 1992 †
 Goniofusus Vermeij & Snyder, 2018
 Gracilipurpura Jousseaume, 1880
 Granulifusus Kuroda & Habe, 1954
 Harasewychia Petuch, 1987
 Harfordia Dall, 1921
 Heilprinia Grabau, 1904
 Helolithus Agassiz, 1846 †
 Hesperaptyxis Snyder & Vermeij, 2016
 Lepidocolus Maxwell, 1992 †
 Liracolus Maxwell, 1992 †
 Lyonsifusus Vermeij & Snyder, 2018
 Marmorofusus Snyder & Lyons, 2014
 Okutanius Kantor, Fedosov, Snyder & Bouchet, 2018
 Ollaphon Iredale, 1929
 Priscofusus Conrad, 1865 †
 Profusinus Bandel, 2000 †
 Propefusus Iredale, 1924
 Pseudaptyxis Petuch, 1988 †
 Pullincola de Gregorio, 1894 †
 Remera Stephenson, 1941 †
 Rhopalithes Grabau, 1904 †
 Simplicifusus Kira, 1972
 Solutofusus Pritchard, 1898 †
 Spirilla Agassiz, 1842 †
 Streptocarina Hinsch, 1977 †
 Streptochetus Cossmann, 1889  †
 Streptodictyon Tembrock, 1961 †
 Streptolathyrus Cossmann, 1901 †
 Tectifusus Tate, 1893 †
 Trophonofusus Kuroda & Habe, 1971
 Turrispira Conrad, 1866 †
 Vermeijius Kantor, Fedosov, Snyder & Bouchet, 2018
 Viridifusus Snyder, Vermeij & Lyons, 2012

subfamily Peristerniinae

 Peristernia Mörch, 1852 - type genus of the subfamily Peristerniinae
 Aptycholathyrus Cossman & Pissarro, 1905 †
 Ascolatirus Bellardi, 1884 †
 Benimakia Habe, 1958
 Brocchitas Finlay, 1927 †
 Bullockus Lyons & Snyder, 2008
 Dennantia Tate, 1888 †
 Dentifusus Vermeij & Rosenberg, 2003
 Dolicholatirus Bellardi, 1886
 Eolatirus Bellardi, 1884 †
 Exilifusus Conrad, 1865 †
 Fractolatirus Iredale, 1936
 Fusolatirus Kuroda & Habe, 1971
 Hemipolygona Rovereto, 1899
 Lathyropsis Oostingh, 1939 †
 Latirofusus Cossmann, 1889
 Latirogona Laws, 1944 †
 Latirolagena Harris, 1897
 Latirulus Cossmann, 1889
 Latirus Montfort, 1810
 Leucozonia Gray, 1847
 Lightbournus Lyons & Snyder, 2008
 Liochlamys Dall, 1889 †
 Mazzalina Conrad, 1960 †
 Neolatirus Bellardi, 1884 †
 Nodolatirus Bouchet & Snyder, 2013
 Nodopelagia Hedley, 1915
 Opeatostoma Berry, 1958
 Plesiolatirus Bellardi, 1884 †
 Plicatella Swainson, 1840
 Polygona Schumacher, 1817
 Psammostoma Vermeij & Snyder, 2002 †
 Pseudolatirus Bellardi, 1884
 Pustulatirus Vermeij & Snyder, 2006
 Ruscula Casey, 1904 †
 Streptopelma Cossmann, 1901 †
 Tarantinaea Monterosato, 1917
 Taron Hutton, 1883
 Teralatirus Coomans, 1965
 Turrilatirus Vermeij & M.A. Snyder, 2006

 Subfamily ?
 Crassibougia Stahlschmidt & Fraussen, 2012

 Genera brought into synonymy
 Aptyxis Troschel, 1868: synonym of Fusinus Rafinesque, 1815
 Buccinofusus Conrad, 1868: synonym of Conradconfusus Snyder, 2002 †
 Bulbifusus Conrad, 1865 †: synonym of Mazzalina Conrad, 1960 †
 Chasca Clench & Aguayo, 1941: synonym of Chascax Watson, 1873: synonym of Hemipolygona Rovereto, 1899
 Chascax Watson, 1873: synonym of Hemipolygona Rovereto, 1899
 Cinctura Hollister, 1957: synonym of Fasciolaria Lamarck, 1799
 Clavella Swainson, 1835: synonym of Clavilithes Swainson, 1840 †
 Cymatium Link, 1807: synonym of Latirus Montfort, 1810
 Exilifusus Gabb, 1876 †: synonym of Fusinus Rafinesque, 1815
 Fusilatirus McGinty, 1955: synonym of Dolicholatirus Bellardi, 1884
 Fusus Bruguière, 1789: synonym of Fusinus Rafinesque, 1815
 Gracilipurpura Jousseaume, 1881 †: synonym of Fusinus Rafinesque, 1815
 Heilprinia Grabau, 1904: synonym of Fusinus Rafinesque, 1815
 Iaeranea Rafinesque, 1815: synonym of Fasciolaria Lamarck, 1799
 Lagena Schumacher, 1817: synonym of Latirolagena Harris, 1897
 Lathyrus Schinz, 1825: synonym of Latirus Montfort, 1810
 Latirofusus Cossmann, 1889: synonym of Dolicholatirus Bellardi, 1884
 Latyrus Carpenter, 1857: synonym of Latirus Montfort, 1810
 Propefusus Iredale, 1924: synonym of Fusinus Rafinesque, 1815
 Pseudofusus Monterosato, 1884: synonym of Fusinus Rafinesque, 1815
 Pseudolatirus Cossmann, 1889 †: synonym of Streptolathyrus Cossmann, 1901 †
 Simplicifusus Kira, 1972: synonym of Granulifusus Kuroda & Habe, 1954
 Sinistralia H. Adams & A. Adams, 1853: synonym of Fusinus Rafinesque, 1815
 Tarantinaea Monterosato, 1917: synonym of Fasciolaria Lamarck, 1799

References

External links

 
Gastropod families
Taxa named by John Edward Gray